The 2018 United States House of Representatives election in the United States Virgin Islands was held on Tuesday, November 6, 2018, to elect the non-voting Delegate to the United States House of Representatives from the United States Virgin Islands' at-large congressional district. The election will coincide with the larger United States House election and other elections in the United States Virgin Islands, such as the 2018 gubernatorial general election.

The non-voting delegate is elected for a two-year term. Incumbent delegate Stacey Plaskett, a Democrat, who sought re-election for a third term, was the only declared candidate. She was unopposed in the primary and general elections.

Candidates

Declared
 Stacey Plaskett, Democrat, incumbent Delegate

General election

References

External links

United States Virgin Islands
2018
United States House of Representatives